St. John's Primary School may refer to:

St. John's Primary School, Knaresborough, England
St. John's Primary School, Ayr, Ayrshire, Scotland
St. John's Primary School, Coalisland, Coalisland, County Tyrone, Northern Ireland
St. John's Primary School, Euroa, Euroa, Victoria, Australia
St. John's Primary School, Gilford, Gilford, County Down, Northern Ireland
St. John's Primary School, Harare, Harare, Zimbabwe
St. John's Primary School, Middletown, Middletown, County Armagh, Northern Ireland
St. John's Primary School, Moy, Moy, County Tyrone, Northern Ireland
St. John's Primary School, Newry, County Down, Northern Ireland
St. John's Primary School, Portadown, Portadown, County Armagh, Northern Ireland
St. John's Primary School, Stevenston, Stevenston, Ayrshire, Scotland
St John's Roman Catholic Primary School, Banbury, Oxfordshire, England
St. John's Church of England Primary School, Croydon, England
St. Johns Primary School, Worksop, Nottinghamshire, England